Ashwini Bhide-Deshpande (born 7 October 1960) is a Hindustani classical music vocalist from Mumbai. She belongs to the Jaipur-Atrauli gharana tradition.

Early life and education

Born in Mumbai into a family with strong musical tradition, Ashwini started classical training under Narayanrao Datar, the elder brother of violinist D. K. Datar. She then completed her Sangeet Visharad from the Gandharva Mahavidyalaya. Since then, she has been learning music in the Jaipur-Atrauli style from her mother Manik Bhide, a disciple of Gaansaraswati Kishori Amonkar. Ashwini also received guidance from Ratnakar Pai until his death in 2009.

Bhide-Deshpande holds a Master's degree in Microbiology and earned a doctorate in Biochemistry from Bhabha Atomic Research Centre, a Sangeet Visharad from the Akhil Bharatiya Gandharva Mahavidyalaya Mandal, Mumbai. She has also been the recipient of an honorary D.Lit. from ITM University (Gwalior).

Performing career
Bhide-Deshpande has performed at venues including the Aga Khan Museum in Toronto, Canada in 2019 for the Raag-Mala Music Society of Toronto.

Bhide-Deshpande has an understanding of Bandish and bandish-composition and has created many of her own bandishes, which she has published in her book, Raag Rachananjali (2004). A sequel titled "Ragarachananjali 2", containing 98 more bandishes (compositions) was published in 2010. She is also known for her setting of bhajans, especially those of Kabir.

Discography
 Introducing Ashwini Bhide (HMV; 1985) - Raag Yaman, Raag Tilak Kamod, Bhajan
 Rhythm House Classics (Rhythm House; 1987) - Raag Puriya Dhanashri, Raag Bhoop, Bhajan
 Ashwini Bhide Sings (HMV; 1988) - Raag Kedar, Raag Khambavati, Raag Bhoop Nat
 Live for Femina (Rhythm House; 1989) - Raag Nand, Raag Bageshri
 Morning Ragas Vol. 1 (Rhythm House; 1990) - Raag Lalit, Raag Vibhas
 Morning Ragas Vol. 2 (Rhythm House; 1990) - Raag Todi, Raag Kabir Bhairav, Raag Sukhiya Bilawal
 Bhaktimala: Ganesh Vol. 2 (Music Today; 1991) - "Jehi Sumirat Siddhi Hoi," "Jai Shri Shankar Sut Ganesh," "Jai Ganesh Gananath," "Ganapat Vighna Harana"
 Bhaktimala: Shakti Vol. 2 (Music Today; 1991) - "Jwalatkoti Balark," "Tero Chakar Kare Pukar," "Jai Jai Jai Giriraj Kishori," "Main Dharu Tiharo Dhyan"
 Bhaktimala: Krishna Vol. 2 (Music Today;1991) - "Madhurashtakam," "Mhari Surta Suhagan," "Kaisi Hori Machaiyi," "Sundar Badan Sukh," "Ka Karoon Na Mane"
 Bhaktimala: Namastotram, Ganesh (Music Today;1991) - Bhajans
 Young Masters (Music Today; 1992) - Raag Bhimpalas, Raag Shuddha Kalyan
 Raag Rang Vol. 1 (Alurkar; 1996) - Raag Bihag, Raag Bhinna Shadaj, Bhajan
 Raag Rang Vol. 2 (Alurkar; 1996) - Raag Madhuwanti, Raag Jhinjhoti, Raag Jog, Raag Nayaki Kanada
 Pandharpuricha Nila (Sagarika; 1998) - Abhangs
 Women Through the Ages (Navras Records; 1998) - Raag Ahir Bhairav, Raag Jaunpuri, Bhajan
 Krishna (Ninaad Music; 1999) - Raag Jaijaiwanti, Raag Vachaspati, Raag Megh Malhar, Jhoola, Bhajan
 Anandacha Kand (Megh Music; 2000) - Abhangs
 Ashwini Bhide-Deshpande Vol. 1 (Alurkar; 2000) - Raag Bilaskhani Todi, Raag Gujri Todi, Raag Nat Bhairav
 Ashwini Bhide-Deshpande Vol. 2 (Alurkar; 2000) - Raag Rageshri, Raag Durga, Raag Yaman
 Golden Raaga Collection (Times Music; 2000) - Raag Multani, Raag Gaud Malhar, Bhajan
 Swar Utsav (Music Today; 2002) - Raag Jhinjhoti, Raag Nayaki Kanada
 Navagraha Puja (Sony Music; 2002) - Bhajans
 Ashwini Bhide-Deshpande - Vocal (India Archive Music; 2003) - Raag Bageshri, Raag Kedar, Bhajan
 Roop Pahata Lochani (Self-published; 2004) - Abhangs
 Ragarachananjali (Rajhansa Prakashan; 2004) - Book and CD of self composed bandishes
 Kari Badariya (Self-published; 2005) - Raagas Abhogi and Prateeksha, Jhoola, Dadra
 Sandhya (Sense World Music; 2006) - Raag Bageshri, Bhajan
 Soordas (Self-published; 2009) - Bhajans
 Unmesh (Self-published; 2010) - Raagas Vibhavati, Puriya Dhanashri, Raag Patdeep, Raag Manikauns
 Ragarachananjali 2 (Rajhansa Prakashan; 2010) - Book and CD of self composed bandishes
 Arghyam (East Meets West; 2013) - Utsav Janasanmodini, Utsav Bairagi Todi, Utsav Nandadhwani, Utsav Charukauns, Utsav Pancham se Gara

Publications
 Ragarachananjali (Rajhansa Prakashan; 2004) - Book and CD of self composed bandishes
 Ragarachananjali 2 (Rajhansa Prakashan; 2010) - Book and CD of self composed bandishes
 Madam Curie - मादाम क्युरी (2015) - Marathi translation of Eve Curie's biography of Marie Curie.

References

External links

 Ashwini Bhide-Deshpande's Website 
 Structure and balance
 The Jaipur gharana (includes sound samples)

1960 births
Living people
Hindustani singers
Singers from Mumbai
Indian women classical singers
20th-century Indian singers
Women Hindustani musicians
20th-century Indian women singers
21st-century Indian women singers
21st-century Indian singers
Women musicians from Maharashtra
Jaipur gharana
Recipients of the Sangeet Natak Akademi Award